Operation Cocoa Beach was a US Army operation that took place along Highway 13 near Lai Khê, lasting from 3 to 8 March 1966.

Prelude
After unsuccessful attempts to lure large enemy units into combat in Operation Crimp (8–14 January 1966) and Operation Mastiff (21–27 February 1966), Colonel William Brodbeck, commander of the 3rd Brigade, 1st Infantry Division decided to reduce the size of units sent into the field in order to invite enemy attack. The plan called for a series of battalion sized operations around Bau Bang west of Highway 13, north of Lai Khê, where the Viet Cong 272nd Regiment of the 9th Division was believed to be operating.

Operation
On 3 March the 2nd Battalion, 28th Infantry Regiment marched into the Lo Ke Rubber Plantation west of Bau Bang and established a patrol base.

On 4 March patrols discovered trenches that could be used as jumping off positions for an attack on the patrol base.

In the early morning of 5 March a patrol led by 2Lt Robert John Hibbs detected movement north of the base. At dawn they observed a supply column of children and armed women to the northeast of the base which met up with a company of Viet Cong coming from the north. The Viet Cong and some of the supply column moved south towards the patrol which then triggered two Claymore mines and began engaging the Viet Cong. The patrol then disengaged and moved back to the base, fighting through another enemy unit 100m from the base perimeter. 2Lt Hibbs and his sergeant stopped to help a wounded man, but were hit by Viet Cong machine-gun fire, 2Lt Hibbs then attacked the machine-gun position and was mortally wounded. The Viet Cong then launched an attack on the northern perimeter of patrol base but were repulsed and then started attacking from multiple directions. Airstrikes were called in and by mid-morning the Viet Cong withdrew.

At 10:50 the 1st Battalion, 16th Infantry Regiment was deployed by helicopter to a landing zone 2 kilometres northeast of the patrol base in an attempt to block the retreating attackers. The Battalion moved southwest towards the patrol base engaging a small Viet Cong unit and reached the patrol base at 14:30.

On 6 March the 2nd Battalion, 2nd Infantry Regiment was also deployed into the area and the 3 Battalions swept the area finding only Viet Cong dead and equipment. The operation concluded on 8 March 1966.

Aftermath
Operation Cocoa Beach was a US tactical success. Total US casualties were 15 killed, while US claimed the Viet Cong losses were 199 killed (body count).

2Lt Hibbs was posthumously awarded the Medal of Honor on 24 February 1967.

References

Conflicts in 1966
1966 in Vietnam
Battles involving the United States
Battles involving Vietnam
Battles and operations of the Vietnam War in 1966
History of Bình Dương province